Johan Andersson is a Swedish video game designer and studio manager for Paradox Tinto, a Barcelona-based division of Paradox Interactive.

Career 

Before working for Paradox Interactive, he was an employee of Funcom where he worked as a programmer for Sega Genesis games, such as Nightmare Circus and NBA Hangtime. He began working at what would later become Paradox Interactive in 1998, joining the original team that had been developing Europa Universalis.

Although he began his career as a programmer, Andersson later became a designer and producer at Paradox Development Studio, working on grand strategy games such as Hearts of Iron III, Crusader Kings II, Victoria II, Europa Universalis IV, Stellaris, and Imperator: Rome.

Andersson's design philosophy is "to create believable worlds."

In June 2020, he became the lead of Paradox Tinto, a newly established studio based in Barcelona.

References

External links 
Corporate biography

Living people
Video game programmers
Video game producers
Swedish computer programmers
Swedish video game designers
1974 births